Zulia Fútbol Club was a professional football club that last competed in the Primera División Venezolana. The club was based in Maracaibo, Zulia State, Venezuela, and it's internationally recognized for his participation in the 2019 Copa Sudamericana, where the club was eliminated by Colón de Santa Fe, Argentinian club, in quarter-finals.

On 12 December 2022, it was announced that Zulia would merge into Segunda División side Deportivo Rayo Zuliano, with the latter taking the former's place in the Venezuelan Primera División. The merger was officially confirmed on 28 January 2023.

Titles
 Venezuelan Primera División: 1
Runners-up: 1 (2016)
Torneo Clausura: 1 (2016)

Copa Venezuela: 2
2016, 2018

Venezuelan Segunda División: 1
2007–08

Venezuelan Segunda División B: 1
2006–07

Venezuelan Tercera División: 1
2005–06

Current squad

Top goalscorers

References

External links
 Official Site 
 Official Squad List 
 2014-15 Final Standings 

Football clubs in Venezuela
Association football clubs established in 2005
Association football clubs disestablished in 2022
Defunct football clubs in Venezuela
2005 establishments in Venezuela
2022 disestablishments in Venezuela
Sport in Maracaibo
Zulia